Bessonovsky District is an administrative and municipal district (raion), one of the twenty-seven in Penza Oblast, Russia. It is located in the center of the oblast. Its administrative center is the rural locality (a selo) of Bessonovka. Population: 45,296 (2010 Census);  The population of Bessonovka accounts for 25.2% of the district's total population.

Notable residents 

Vasily Sergeevich Nemchinov (1894–1964), Soviet economist and mathematician, born in the village of Grabovo

References

Notes

Sources

Districts of Penza Oblast